Pyotr Petrovich Suvchinsky, later known as Pierre Souvtchinsky (October 5, 1892, St-Petersburg – January 24, 1985, Paris), was a Russian artistic patron and writer on music. The heir to a sugar fortune, he took piano lessons from Felix Blumenfeld and initially hoped to become an operatic tenor. He was the patron and co-publisher of the Saint Petersburg musical journal Muzikalniy sovremennik founded in 1915. He was a friend of Nikolai Myaskovsky, Sergei Prokofiev and Igor Stravinsky, and was the real author of the book La poétique musicale, published as by Stravinsky. (Prokofiev dedicated his Piano Sonata No. 5 to Suvchinsky.) Suvchinsky emigrated from Russia in 1922 and lived in Berlin and Sofia, where he founded the Russian-Bulgarian Publishing House; then in Paris, where he remained for the rest of his life. He was still active in musical circles  and a champion of the music of Olivier Messiaen and Pierre Boulez in the post-war period; he was a co-founder, with Boulez and Jean-Louis Barrault, of the Domaine musical concert series.

References
 Richard Taruskin, Stravinsky and the Russian Traditions (Oxford University Press, 1996), especially pp. 1120–1134.
  Éric Humbertclaude (ed.), Pierre Souvtchinski, cahiers d'étude (Harmattan, 2006). .

1892 births
1985 deaths
Ukrainian writers
Eurasianism
Writers about music
Soviet emigrants to Germany